Championnat Lige Nationale B (Ligue Nationale B) is the second-tier level professional club basketball league in Switzerland. It is organized by Swiss Basketball.

Promotion and relegation
The professional Swiss Basketball association is divided into two championships, the top-tier level SBL, and the 2nd-tier level LNB, with a system of promotion and relegation between them.

LNB teams 
STB Bern-Giants
CPE Meyrin Geneve
BBC Nyon
BBC Lausanne
BCKE Wallabies
Villars Basket
Grasshopper Club Zurich
Groupe E Academie Fribourg U23
Lugano Tigers U23
Pully Basket
Zürich Wildcats

Champions

References

External links 
 League Home 

Basketball leagues in Switzerland
Switzer
1933 establishments in Switzerland
Sports leagues established in 1933
Professional sports leagues in Switzerland